Jean d'Arcet or Jean Darcet (7 September 1724 – 12 February 1801) was a French chemist, and director of the porcelain works at Sèvres. He was one of the first to manufacture porcelain in France.

Darcet was probably born in Doazit, where his family resided, but was baptised in Audignon.

In 1774 he was appointed professor of chemistry in the Collège de France and in 1795 he became a member of the Institute.

He died in Paris.

His publications include: Sur l'action d'un feu égal sur un grand nombre de terres (1766–71); Expériences sur plusieurs diamants et pierres précieuses (1772); Rapport sur l'electricité dans les maladies nerveuses (1783).

See also
 Royal Commission on Animal Magnetism

References
Jaime Wisniak: "Jean Darcet", Revista CENIC Ciencias Químicas, Vol. 35, No. 2, 2004.
 Bailly, J.-S., "Secret Report on Mesmerism or Animal Magnetism", International Journal of Clinical and Experimental Hypnosis, Vol.50, No.4, (October 2002), pp. 364–368. doi=10.1080/00207140208410110
 Franklin, B., Majault, M.J., Le Roy, J.B., Sallin, C.L., Bailly, J.-S., d'Arcet, J., de Bory, G., Guillotin, J.-I. & Lavoisier, A., "Report of The Commissioners charged by the King with the Examination of Animal Magnetism", International Journal of Clinical and Experimental Hypnosis, Vol.50, No.4, (October 2002), pp. 332–363. doi=10.1080/00207140208410109

Academic staff of the Collège de France
18th-century French chemists
Members of the French Academy of Sciences
1724 births
1801 deaths